Hans Christian Andersen is a 1952 Hollywood musical film directed by Charles Vidor and produced by Samuel Goldwyn. The screenplay by Moss Hart and an uncredited Ben Hecht is based on a story by Myles Connolly.

Although it is nominally about Hans Christian Andersen, the 19th-century Danish author of many world-famous fairy tales, the film is romantic fiction, and does not relate to Andersen's biography: the introduction describes it as "not the story of his life, but a fairy tale about this great spinner of fairy tales." Andersen, as played by Danny Kaye, is portrayed as a small-town cobbler with a childlike heart and a vivid imagination.

A large part of the narrative is told through song (music and lyrics by Frank Loesser) and ballet and includes many of the real Andersen's most famous stories, such as The Ugly Duckling, Thumbelina, The Emperor's New Clothes and The Little Mermaid. The film was internationally successful at the time of release.

Plot
In the 1830s, in the small Danish town of Odense, cobbler Hans Christian Andersen spends his day spinning fairy tales for the village children. One day, the stern schoolmaster implores the Burgomaster and councilmen to curtail the cobbler's habit of distracting the students with his storytelling. Hans finally returns to his shop, where his teenage assistant, the orphan Peter, begs him to stop causing trouble.

When the children do not arrive at school the next day, the schoolmaster deduces that Hans is again distracting his pupils. When the schoolmaster then demands that the Burgomaster and the councilmen choose between him and the cobbler, they decide that Hans must leave Odense. Peter tries to save his friend by suggesting they travel to Copenhagen.

After a sea voyage, Hans and Peter arrive at the city's harbor and find their way to the Great Square of Copenhagen. When Hans introduces himself to the crowd while standing on a statue of the king, police arrest him for defaming the image of their leader. Peter, who has sought refuge from the police by hiding by the back entrance of the Royal Theatre, overhears choreographer Niels demand that a company producer send for a cobbler and asks them to free his friend from jail.

Hans sees a lonely young girl outside his jail cell window and offers to introduce her to his companion. By drawing on his thumb, Hans creates a puppet he calls Thumbelina and brings a smile to the girl's face. Soon Hans is bailed out of jail by the theater company and taken to the theater, where he becomes entranced by the beauty and talent of a Royal Danish Ballet dress rehearsal. When Niels ridicules lead ballerina Doro's performance, she in turn complains that her shoes need adjusting.

Doro gives the slippers to Hans, who is immediately smitten with the ballerina. Peter learns that Niels and Doro are a happily married couple, despite their theatrical quarrels. Hans resists the idea and writes a love letter to Doro in the form of a fable called The Little Mermaid, in which he tells her that she has chosen the wrong man. That night while Peter surreptitiously reads the letter, a gust of wind whisks it from his hands and carries it into the theater, where a stage doorman delivers it to Doro.

The next day, the entire ballet company sets off on their annual tour, leaving Hans bereft, but he soon finds comfort entertaining a new group of children with his stories. One day, Lars, a sad boy with a shaved head, remains behind after the other children tease him. Hans tells him the story of an ugly duckling who is ostracized by his peers until he becomes a handsome swan. When not with the children, Hans counts the days by making pair after pair of brightly colored satin slippers for his absent ballerina.

One day, Hans receives an invitation from the Gazette newspaper office, where Lars's father, the publisher, thanks Hans for helping his son overcome his difficulties and offers to publish The Ugly Duckling in the newspaper. Overjoyed by the news, Hans asks that his credit be changed from "Hans, the cobbler" to "Hans Christian Andersen" and runs down the street singing his full name with pride.

That evening, when the ballet company returns, Doro tells Hans that they have created a ballet based on his story The Little Mermaid, which Hans believes is a sign of her love for him. The next evening, Peter warns Hans that Doro will humiliate him. Disappointed by his friend's attitude, Hans suggests that they part ways and leaves for the opening of the new ballet. When Hans tries to deliver Doro's slippers backstage, Niels locks the insistent writer in a closet to prevent him from disrupting the performers. While Hans listens to the music and dreams of his story, the performance opens on stage.

The morning after the ballet, Doro sends for Hans and discovers that he is in love with her and has misunderstood her relationship with Niels. Niels interrupts their conversation and insults Hans by offering to pay him for The Little Mermaid. Hans refuses Niels's offer and claims that his writing was a fluke. Doro accepts the slippers Hans made for her and allows him to leave. On the road to Odense, Hans meets Peter and renews their friendship. Upon reaching town, Hans is greeted as a celebrity and regales the citizens, including the schoolmaster, with his now famous moral tales.

Cast

 Danny Kaye - Hans Christian Andersen
 Farley Granger - Niels
 Zizi Jeanmaire - Doro
 Beverly Washburn - little girl outside the jailhouse
 Joseph Walsh - Peter
 Philip Tonge - Otto
 Erik Bruhn - The Hussar in "Ice Skating Ballet"
 Roland Petit - The Prince in "The Little Mermaid" Ballet
 John Brown - Schoolmaster
 John Qualen - Burgomaster
 Jeanne Lafayette - Celine
 Robert Malcolm - Stage Doorman
 George Chandler - Gerta's Father
 Fred Kelsey - First Gendarme
 Gil Perkins - Second Gendarme
 Peter Votrian - Lars (as Peter Votrian)
 Barrie Chase - Ballerina in "The Little Mermaid" Ballet
 Sylvia Lewis - Ballerina in "The Little Mermaid" Ballet

Production
Producer Samuel Goldwyn conceived the idea for the film in 1936 and employed numerous writers to work on early drafts of the screenplay over the years. In 1941 he was reportedly in discussions with Walt Disney Studios to produce the film, but the deal fell through.

The film was eventually produced in the spring of 1952. As Danish authorities weren't consulted on the film, there were complaints from Denmark that the film was a fairy tale rather than the true story of Andersen's life and the Danish Foreign Office considered making a formal protest against the film.

Soundtrack
The soundtrack features eight songs, all with words and music by Frank Loesser.
"The King's New Clothes"
"The Inch Worm"
"I'm Hans Christian Andersen"
"Wonderful Copenhagen"
"Thumbelina"
"The Ugly Duckling"
"Anywhere I Wander"
"No Two People"
A studio cast recording of the film's songs was released by Decca, with Danny Kaye and Jane Wyman, as well as a backup chorus singing the songs. The album also included two Sylvia Fine originals made specifically for the album, "Uncle Pockets" and "There's a Hole at the Bottom of the Sea", and Danny Kaye's narration of two Tubby the Tuba stories by Paul Tripp. The songs were originally released as a series of four 78 rpm singles, with two songs per disk, a 45 rpm album, and a 10" LP.

The music for the Little Mermaid ballet incorporates passages from various pieces by Franz Liszt including Gnomenreigen and the Mephisto Waltzes.

Release
The film premiered in New York City on November 25, 1952, opening at the Paris Theatre and at the Criterion Theatre, and received a general release in both the United States and United Kingdom on December 19, 1952.

Reception 
The film opened in Copenhagen on September 6, 1953. In its first 6 days of release at two theaters, it grossed $80,000; it ultimately grossed $6 million in North America, making it one of the top ten grossing films of 1952.

Early reviews 
The film received mixed critical response, though in its first week of release at the Palads Teatret it played to full capacity earning 74,000 Danish krone; however, in Andersen's home town of Odense, this film was poorly-received.

Critical reception 
The film holds an 83% "Fresh" rating at Rotten Tomatoes, with an average rating of 6/10, based on 6 reviews.

Accolades

The film is recognized by American Film Institute in these lists:
 2004: AFI's 100 Years...100 Songs:
 "Thumbelina" – Nominated
 2006: AFI's Greatest Movie Musicals – Nominated

First telecast
The film was first telecast by ABC-TV in 1966. In an odd reversal of the situation for the early CBS telecasts of The Wizard of Oz, this time a host was needed because the film was too long for a two-hour time slot, rather than too short. It runs exactly two hours without commercials, and ABC did not wish to cut it, so they presented it as a family special with Victor Borge as host, and padded the telecast out to two-and-a-half hours. Borge was selected because, like the real Hans Christian Andersen, he was Danish.

In popular culture
"Inchworm" was featured in season 3, episode 16 of The Muppet Show, wherein Kaye guest starred.

References

External links

 
 
 
 
 Hans Christian Andersen at Rotten Tomatoes

1952 films
1952 musical films
1950s historical musical films
American historical musical films
Films based on fairy tales
Cultural depictions of Hans Christian Andersen
Musicals by Frank Loesser
Films set in the 19th century
Films set in Copenhagen
Biographical films about writers
Samuel Goldwyn Productions films
Films directed by Charles Vidor
Films scored by Walter Scharf
Films based on The Little Mermaid
Films based on Thumbelina
Films based on The Ugly Duckling
1950s English-language films
1950s American films